= The Hague Court =

The Hague Court can refer to:

- International Court of Justice
- International Criminal Court
